Sohail Anwar Siyal (born 26 June 1975) is a Pakistani politician who was born in Larkana. He is a member of the Provincial Assembly of Sindh since August 2018. He has also been the Provincial Minister of Irrigation and Zakat Establishment since August 2019. Previously, he had been the Provincial Minister for Agriculture, Supply & Prices, Mines & Minerals, and Home from June 2013 to May 2018. He had also been a member of the Provincial Assembly of Sindh from May 2013 to May 2018. He received a BA degree from Shah Latif University Khairpur and a Civil Engineering degree from Mehran University Jamshoro.

Political career 
He was elected to the Provincial Assembly of Sindh as a candidate of Pakistan Peoples Party (PPP) from PS-35 Larkana-I in the 2013 Sindh provincial election.

He was re-elected to Provincial Assembly of Sindh as a candidate of PPP from PS-12 Larkana-III in the 2018 Sindh provincial election.

References

Pakistan People's Party MPAs (Sindh)
Living people
Sindhi people
Sindh MPAs 2008–2013
Sindh MPAs 2013–2018
1975 births
Shah Abdul Latif University alumni